War of the Buttons is a 2011 French film directed by Christophe Barratier.

Plot
The story takes place in March 1944 in a small French village. The young people from the neighbouring villages of Longeverne and Velrans have been waging this merciless war as long as anyone can remember: the buttons of all the little prisoners' clothes are removed so that they head home almost naked, vanquished and humiliated. Consequently, this conflict is known as the "War of the Buttons". The village that collects the most buttons will be declared the winner. Meanwhile, Violette, a young Jewish girl, has caught the eye of Lebrac, the intelligent chief of the Longeverne kids who is coming of age, leading his gang and their rivals to consider putting aside their differences in order to protect her from the Nazis.

Cast
 Laetitia Casta as Simone
 Guillaume Canet as the teacher
 Kad Merad as Father Lebrac
 Gérard Jugnot as Father Aztec
 Jean Texier as Lebrac
 Clément Godefroy as Petit (Little) Gibus
 Marc-Henri Wajnberg as Vladimir
 Théophile Baquet as Grand (Big) Gibus
 François Morel as Father Bacaillé
 Louis Dussol as Bacaillé
 Harold Werner as Crique
 Nathan Parent as Camus
 Ilona Bachelier as Violette
 Thomas Goldberg as the Aztec

Discography
The CD soundtrack composed by Philippe Rombi was released on Music Box Records label.

Reception
, the film holds a 25% approval rating on review aggregation website Rotten Tomatoes, based on 24 reviews, with an average rating of 4.82 out of 10. At Metacritic, which assigns a normalized rating out of 100 to reviews from mainstream critics, the film received an average score of 41 out of 100, based on 14 reviews, indicating "mixed or average reviews".

References

External links
 

2011 films
French adventure films
2010s French-language films
Films directed by Christophe Barratier
Films based on French novels
Films produced by Thomas Langmann
2010s French films